George Moore (1811–1871) was a landowner who became the High Sheriff of Derbyshire and built Appleby Hall in Leicestershire.

Biography

Moore was born in 1811 at his mother Susan's ancestral home of Snarestone Hall. Susan's maiden name was Drummond and she had married Moores father who was also called George (1778–1827) the year before. His father and Susan had another daughter Susan Drummond but his mother died in 1813. His father then married Elizabeth Hurt of Alderwasley but there were no other children.

Moore became Lord of the Appleby Parva Manor on 23 June 1827 when his father died and he set out on a large campaign of building. Between 1832 and 1836 the existing Appleby House was extended with a new classical wing. The new extension was so large that the building was renamed. So in 1837 when George became High Sheriff of Derbyshire he was recorded as of Appleby Hall.

Susan Drummond Moore, married Edward Holden of Aston-on-Trent on 22 November 1832 In 1838 Edward Holden served as High Sheriff of Derbyshire taking over from Moore, who had been Sheriff the year before.

References

1871 deaths
1811 births
People from North West Leicestershire District
High Sheriffs of Derbyshire